Catherine Jane Hamilton (1841–1935)  was an author and journalist who also wrote under the pen name, Retlaw Spring.

Life
She was born to a family with Irish roots in Somerset, second daughter of Richard Hamilton (1805/6–1859), vicar of Kilmersdon, and his wife, Charlotte, née Cooper (1809–1882). She was baptised on 12 April 1841. As a child Hamilton was raised at the old vicarage but suffered a bout of typhoid fever and was extremely ill. Her father moved the family to a better house when she was eleven as a result. She was educated at home with her sister by governesses and learned French, Latin and Greek due to her father's influence. She taught in the local Sunday school and helped her father as he lost both his hearing and sight. His death in 1859 left the family unable to survive and they had to rely on relatives for support. They moved to Ballickmoyler, Queen’s County, Ireland where her mother's family had a home. Hamilton lived in Ireland for many years. Her sister married a widower, Wrigley Grimshaw, in 1875. Hamilton was living with her for the census in 1901.

Career
Hamilton published over twenty-five books including drama, poetry and fiction. Initially, she wrote under the pen name but after 1880, she started signing her work as C. J. Hamilton. Hamilton wrote religious fiction for children as well as shorter tales in illustrated journals aimed at children. She also wrote fiction for a wide number of journals such as Englishwoman’s Domestic Magazine and Young Englishwoman, Dublin University Magazine, The Graphic, St. Paul's Magazine, The National Review and London Society.

Hamilton wrote a series on notable women writers, actors and intellectuals which was eventually produced in volumes for publication. She was employed by the Weekly Irish Times from 1906 and Pall Mall Gazette from 1913. She was a member of the Women Writers' Club and the Institute of Journalists. By 1906, Hamilton had returned to London where she remained for about ten years. She then moved to Devon and Bury St Edmunds. She died 28 February 1935, in Freckenham.

Selected works
 Notable Irishwomen, (1904)
 Women writers:their works and ways, (1892)
 Famous love matches
 Marriage Bonds, (1878)
 Hedged with Thorns: or, Working, Waiting and Winning. London: Ward, Lock, 1875
 Marriage Bonds: or, Christian Hazell's Married Life. London: Ward, Lock, 1879
 The Flynns of Flynnville. London: Ward, Lock, 1880
 Mr. Bartram's Daughter: An Every-Day Story. Derby: Bemrose and Sons, 1882
 True to the Core: A Romance of '98. 2 vol. London: F. V. White, 1883
 Rivals at School: or, A Lesson for Life. London: Sunday School Union, 1888
 Dr. Belton's Daughters. London: Ward, Lock, 1890
 The Battle of the Waves: or, The Herring Boat. London: R.T.S., 1890
 The Merry-go-Round. London: R.T.S., 1894
 From Hand to Hand: or, The Adventures of a Jubilee Sixpence. London: Partridge, 1895
 The Strange Adventures of Willie Norman. London: R.T.S., 1898
 A Flash of Youth. London: Sands, 1900
 Frank and Flo on their Travels. London: R.T.S., 1901
 The Macsorley Talisman, The Graphic Christmas 1876
 Two drawing room plays, Defeated: A Tale [Beeton's Christmas Annual] by Hannah Lynch (London: London : Ward, Lock & Co. 1885])

References

Further reading
 

1841 births
1935 deaths
19th-century Irish novelists
20th-century Irish novelists
Irish women novelists
19th-century British novelists
20th-century British novelists
British women novelists
Irish journalists
Irish women journalists
19th-century British journalists
20th-century British journalists
British women journalists
Pseudonymous women writers
19th-century pseudonymous writers